Carola Britt Therese Söberg (born 29 July 1982) is a Swedish football coach and former goalkeeper. She played for clubs including Umeå IK, Tyresö FF and KIF Örebro DFF of the Damallsvenskan, as well as Avaldsnes IL of the Norwegian Toppserien. She won 11 caps for Sweden at senior international level.

Club career
At the end of the 2006 season, Everton FC supporter Söberg left Mallbackens IF for reigning league champions Umeå IK.

Tyresö won the Damallsvenskan title for the first time in the 2012 season and Söberg collected her third league winner's medal, in addition to two won with Umeå. Despite the arrival of Tinja-Riikka Korpela, Söberg retained her place and played in Tyresö's 4–3 defeat by Wolfsburg in the 2014 UEFA Women's Champions League Final. When Tyresö FF folded during the 2014 Damallsvenskan season, Söberg signed for Avaldsnes IL of the Norwegian Toppserien.

After the expiry of her six-month contract in Norway, Söberg returned to Sweden with KIF Örebro DFF. She retired from playing after the 2017 Damallsvenskan season, then took a coaching role with Örebro's under-19 team and began working as an agent.

International career
Söberg played seven times for Sweden's national under–21 team. She made her senior international debut against Scotland on 17 February 2007.

Honours

Club
 Umeå IK
 Damallsvenskan (2): Winner 2007, 2008
 Svenska Cupen (1): Winner 2007
 Svenska Supercupen (2): Winner 2007, 2008

 Tyresö FF
 Damallsvenskan (1): Winner 2012

References

External links

 
 
 Profile  at SvFF
 
  
 

1982 births
Living people
Sportspeople from Karlstad
Swedish women's footballers
Swedish expatriate women's footballers
Swedish expatriate sportspeople in Norway
Expatriate women's footballers in Norway
Sweden women's international footballers
QBIK players
Tyresö FF players
Damallsvenskan players
Umeå IK players
Mallbackens IF players
Avaldsnes IL players
Toppserien players
KIF Örebro DFF players
2015 FIFA Women's World Cup players
Women's association football goalkeepers